The Black Pirate (Jon Valor) is a fictional character from DC Comics, created by Sheldon Moldoff. He first appeared in Action Comics #23 (April 1940). His ghost played an important role in James Robinson's 1990s Starman series.

Fictional character biography
In the 16th century, Jon Valor was a privateer working on a commission from the King, and always working to a strong moral code of justice.

Jon would have multiple adventures. His Black Pirate identity would bring him involved with his adversary, Don Carlos, who wanted Jon to hunt down the Black Pirate. Jon's costume would change from its singular dark colors to a wild, more colorful one. He would even gain a sidekick in his adventures, his son Justin.

At some point Black Pirate was pulled from his own timeline by the futuristic villain known as the Lord of Time and brought to the year 3786. Along with four other time-displaced adventurers, these "Five Warriors from Forever" were manipulated into attacking the Eternity Brain. Before long the Five Warriors from Forever were captured and imprisoned inside of a dungeon. They were liberated thanks to the combined efforts of the Justice League of America and the Justice Society of America. After which, each of the displaced adventurers were sent back to their proper time eras.

Upon his return, he continued to fight alongside his son Justin. Many years would pass. The two separate and Jon eventually finds out his son had been murdered. Accused of the crime himself, he was hung in the port that would eventually become Opal City. Before his death, he crafted a curse on the city that no person who died there (nor his old crew) would rest until Jon's name had been cleared. He remains in the city as a ghost.

His grandson Jack Valor took over the mantle of the Black Pirate. Although he lost his ship in a fight with Blackbeard he was instrumental in helping a time-lost Bruce Wayne return to his own era.

Starman
The Black Pirate appears as a mysterious shadowy form, helping the rookie hero Jack Knight fight a crime wave caused by the villain Mist. Jon helps Jack from the sidelines, slaying many of the Mist's soldiers. Eventually he contacts Jack directly and asks for his help, at the time also relating the circumstances of his death. Knight, of course, promises to prove the Black Pirate's innocence. Before he can fulfill this, the murderous dwarf Culp uses Jon's curse for his own evil purposes. Culp's plans fall apart when the legendary detective Hamilton Drew, working with Ralph and Sue Dibny proves Jon was innocent. Not only was Jon's soul freed, every soul that had ever died in Opal was freed also.

Other versions
In the 1997 Tangent Comics one-shot Sea Devils, Black Pirate lends his name to a pub in New Atlantis, in turn the pub is shown to only sell Blue Devil beer.

In other media
Jon Valor appears in the Legends of Tomorrow season one episode "Marooned", as a time pirate captain portrayed by Callum Keith Rennie.

References

External links
 DCU Guide entry on The Black Pirate

Characters created by Sheldon Moldoff
DC Comics superheroes
DC Comics undead characters
Fictional ghosts
Fictional pirates
Comics characters introduced in 1940
DC Comics male superheroes
Fictional people from the 16th-century